The 2014 European Speed Skating Championships, officially the Essent ISU European Speed Skating Championships 2014, were held in Hamar, Norway, from 11 to 12 January 2014.

Schedule
The schedule of events:

All times are CET (UTC+1).

Rules 
All participating skaters are allowed to skate the first two distances. For the third distance, only the best 24 skaters are qualified. For the fourth distance, only the best 8 of the remaining skaters are qualified.

Records

World records

World records going into the championships.

Men

Women

European records

European records going into the championships.

Men

Women

Men's championships

Day 1

500 metres

Note: NRJ = national record for juniors.

5000 metres

Note: NR = national record.

Ranking after two events

Note: NQ = not qualified.

Day 2

1500 metres

Ranking after three events

Note: NQ = not qualified.

10000 metres

Final ranking

Women's championships

Day 1

500 metres

Note: NR = national record.

3000 metres

Ranking after two events

Note: NQ = not qualified.

Day 2

1500 metres

Ranking after three events

Note: WD = withdrew after the distance, NQ = not qualified.

5000 metres

Allround results

See also
 2014 World Allround Speed Skating Championships

References 

European Championships
European Speed Skating Championships
European, 2014
Sport in Hamar
2014 in Norwegian sport